(467 — 15 March 539) was the 28th legendary Emperor of Japan, according to the traditional order of succession.

No firm dates can be assigned to this Emperor's life or reign, but he is conventionally considered to have reigned from 25 January 536 to 15 March 539.

Legendary narrative
Senka is considered to have ruled the country during the early-6th century, but there is a paucity of information about him. There is insufficient material available for further verification and study.

When Emperor Ankan died, he had no offspring; and succession passed to his youngest brother , who will come to be known as Emperor Senka. Emperor Senka was elderly at the time of his enthronement; and his reign is said to have endured for only three years.

Senka's contemporary title would not have been tennō, as most historians believe this title was not introduced until the reigns of Emperor Tenmu and Empress Jitō. Rather, it was presumably , meaning "the great king who rules all under heaven".

During this reign, Soga no Iname is believed to have been the first verifiable Omi (also Ōomi, "Great Minister").

The Emperor is traditionally venerated at a memorial Shinto shrine (misasagi) at Nara. The Imperial Household Agency designates this location as Senka's mausoleum. It is formally named Musa no Tsukisaka no e no misasagi; however, the actual sites of the graves of the early Emperors remain problematic, according to some historians and archaeologists.

Genealogy
Empress: , Emperor Ninken's daughter
, married to Emperor Kinmei
, married to Emperor Kinmei
, married to Emperor Kinmei

Child (died early, gender unknown)

Consort: 

Mother unknown
, married to Emperor Kinmei
, speculated as Emperor Kinmei's son

Ancestry

See also
 Emperor of Japan
 List of Emperors of Japan
 Imperial cult

Notes

References
 Aston, William George. (1896).  Nihongi: Chronicles of Japan from the Earliest Times to A.D. 697. London: Kegan Paul, Trench, Trubner.  
 Brown, Delmer M. and Ichirō Ishida, eds. (1979).  Gukanshō: The Future and the Past. Berkeley: University of California Press. ;  
 Ponsonby-Fane, Richard Arthur Brabazon. (1959).  The Imperial House of Japan. Kyoto: Ponsonby Memorial Society. 
 Titsingh, Isaac. (1834). Nihon Ōdai Ichiran; ou,  Annales des empereurs du Japon.  Paris: Royal Asiatic Society, Oriental Translation Fund of Great Britain and Ireland.  
 Varley, H. Paul. (1980).  Jinnō Shōtōki: A Chronicle of Gods and Sovereigns. New York: Columbia University Press. ;  

 
 

466 births
539 deaths
Japanese emperors
People of Kofun-period Japan
People of Asuka-period Japan
6th-century monarchs in Asia
6th-century Japanese monarchs